Kashanbeh may refer to:
 Kashanbeh-ye Chahardangi
 Kashanbeh-ye Lak
 Kashanbeh-ye Sofla